The Rue Saint-Dominique is a street in the 7th arrondissement of Paris. It was formerly known as Chemin de la Longue Raye (1355), Chemin des Treilles (1433), Chemin Herbu (des Moulins à Vent) (1523), Chemin de l'Oseraie (1527), Chemin du Port (1530), Chemin des Vaches (1542), Chemin de la Justice and Chemin des Charbonniers. It was renamed Rue Saint-Dominique in 1643 after the Dominican monastery set up a few years earlier near the eastern end of the street (now absorbed by the Boulevard Saint-Germain), whose only remnant is the Église Saint-Thomas-d’Aquin on the Place Saint-Thomas-d’Aquin (called Place des Jacobins until 1802, after the Dominicans).

In 1670, Jeanne Baptiste d'Albert de Luynes was born at number 33, the Hôtel de Luynes. It is now destroyed.

Number 14, the Hôtel de Brienne serves as the official residence of the minister of defense.

The Rue Saint-Dominique is crossed by the Esplanade des Invalides.

Popular culture
The Irish musician Rob Smith released a song in March 2011 called "Rue Sainte-Dominique". The music video was shot on the street and surrounding area.

References

Dominican monasteries in France